Silver Cliff may refer to:

Places
United States
Silver Cliff, Colorado
Silver Cliff, Wisconsin

Other
The Silver Cliff, a 2011 Brazilian film